Flight 421 may refer to:

Northwest Airlines Flight 421, crashed on 29 August 1948
Indian Airlines Flight 421, hijacked on 24 August 1984
Garuda Indonesia Flight 421, ditched on 16 January 2002

0421